The 1972 Philadelphia Eagles season was the franchise's 40th season in the National Football League. They failed to improve and declined on their previous output of 6–7–1, winning only two games. The team failed to qualify for the playoffs for the twelfth consecutive season.

Both of the Eagles' victories were one-point decisions on the road vs. AFC teams, 21–20 over the Kansas City Chiefs and 18–17 over the Houston Oilers, a victory which cost the Eagles the #1 selection in the 1973 NFL Draft. The meeting with the Chiefs was the last until 1992, and Kansas City did not come to Philadelphia until 1998.

Following the disastrous season, the third with three wins or fewer since 1968, general manager Pete Retzlaff resigned, and coach Ed Khayat was fired by owner Leonard Tose.

Offseason 
The Eagles held training camp at Albright College in Reading, Pennsylvania. This was their last year there. The next year, they moved camp to Widener University in Chester, Pennsylvania, only 7 miles from Veterans Stadium where they played their home games in Philadelphia.

NFL Draft 
The 1972 NFL Draft was held on February 1–2, 1972. The draft was 17 rounds and a total of 443 players were chosen.

The Eagles chose John Reaves, a quarterback from the University of Florida, with the 14th pick in the 1st round. They had the 14th pick in each of the 17 rounds. They chose 17 players in this year's draft.

The number 1 overall pick went to the Buffalo Bills, who chose Walt Patulski, a defensive end out of the University of Notre Dame.
In the 2nd round with the 40th pick, the Atlanta Falcons took 1971 Heisman Trophy winner Pat Sullivan, a quarterback out of Auburn University

Player selections 
The table shows the Eagles' selections and which picks they had that were traded away and the teams that ended up with those picks. It is possible the Eagles' pick ended up with this team via another team that the Eagles made a trade with.
Not shown are acquired picks that the Eagles traded away.

Roster

Regular season 
On November 12, Tom Dempsey kicked six field goals in one game.

Schedule 

Note: Intra-division opponents are in bold text.

Game recaps 
A recap of the scoring plays and the game scores by quarters during the year. The record after the team's name reflects this game's outcome also.

Week 9 
Sunday, November 12, 1972

Played at Houston Astrodome on AstroTurf in 72F degrees indoors

Week 11 
Sunday, November 26, 1972

Played at Yankee Stadium on grass in 50F degrees with a 15 MPH wind

NOTE: The game was not televised by CBS after striking International Brotherhood of Electrical Workers members cut the transmission cables in The Bronx.

Standings

Postseason 
At the end of 1972 season, head coach Ed Khayat was fired. Mike McCormack, a Washington Redskins assistant coach from 1965 to 1972, was hired in his place. Khayat was never an NFL head coach again, although he would be the head coach of the New Orleans Night of the Arena Football League in 1991.

Awards and honors

References 

Philadelphia Eagles seasons
Philadelphia Eagles
Philadel